Ruizong (睿宗) is a Chinese temple name. It may refer to:
 Emperor Ruizong of Tang (662–716), emperor of the Tang dynasty
 Liu Jun (Northern Han) (926–968), emperor of Northern Han
 Tolui ( 1191–1232), posthumously promoted by his son Kublai who proclaimed the Yuan dynasty
 Zhu Youyuan (1476–1519), Ming dynasty prince, posthumously honored by his son Jiajing Emperor

See also
Yejong (disambiguation) (Korean equivalent)
Duệ Tông (disambiguation) (Vietnamese equivalent)

Temple name disambiguation pages